Deep River is the third studio album by British singer-songwriter and musician Jon Allen, released on 7 July 2014 on the label OK Good Records in the UK.

Track listing

References

2014 albums
Jon Allen (musician) albums